The Groninger Student Rugby Club (G.S.R.C.) is a Dutch rugby union club from Groningen.

History 
The GSRC was officially founded in 1986 although they were playing as an unofficial team since the late 1970s. The club has been playing her home games at the Ascot Manor II since 1990 which is at the sport park Corpus den Hoorn.

Teams 
The club runs two senior sides. 
 The first XV currently (season 2021-2022) plays in NRB 2 (North). 

Both the first and second XV compete in some NSRB (Dutch Student Rugby Union) tournaments as well.

Affiliations 
The GSRC is linked to the University of Groningen. 
The club is affiliated with GSC Vindicat atque Polit.

External links
 Official website

Dutch rugby union teams
1986 establishments in the Netherlands
Rugby clubs established in 1986